Royal Air Force Danby Beacon or more simply RAF Danby Beacon was an early warning radar Royal Air Force station that formed part of the Chain Home network of radar (or Radio Direction Finding (RDF)) stations built by the Royal Air Force immediately prior to the Second World War.

Construction
The construction of these masts was the work of the RAF controlled, but civilian staffed, No. 2 Installation Unit of No. 1 Maintenance Unit RAF (1 MU).

Second World War
During the first part of the war the station was under the control of 13 Group of RAF Fighter Command. On 3 February 1940 it was a plot from Danby that led Hawker Hurricane aircraft from Blue section, 43 Squadron stationed at RAF Acklington to shoot down a Heinkel He 111 bomber over Whitby.  This was the first German aircraft shot down over England during the war, the British aircraft being under the command of (then) Flight Lieutenant Peter Townsend. The intercept is described in detail in Townsend's highly-successful book about the Battle of Britain, "Duel of Eagles."

Soon after control of the station passed to the newly formed 60 Group but its information was passed to 13 Group headquarters in Kenton, Newcastle upon Tyne.

Cold War
In 1946 the station moved to the control of 90 Group and continued to function in the early warning role until 1954 when the station ceased operating. The masts and buildings were demolished in 1957.

Memorial
None of the structures remain but the site of the station is now marked by a memorial stone.

References

 

Royal Air Force stations in Yorkshire
Military history of North Yorkshire